Rashad Muhammad, better known as HazeBanga and HAZE, is a GRAMMY-Winning, ASCAP award-winning music producer and music technology inventor from San Diego, California. He has co-worked with GRAMMY Award-winning producer Hit-Boy on album/single productions for artists like Beyoncé, Mariah Carey, M.I.A., will.i.am, Selena Gomez, and Rita Ora. In 2017, HAZE was nominated for the Grammy Award for Album of the Year for his work on Lemonade.

Musical career
HAZE released his debut instrumental concept album, PHANTASIA, on April 14, 2020.

Discography

Albums

Extended plays

Production Credits
Credits adapted from AllMusic and Discogs.

Awards and nominations

Grammy Awards

ASCAP Rhythm & Soul Music Awards

Filmography

Film

Music videos 
2020
Uni The Fly Pilot - "Time" (Fantasy Visual)

References

External links 

 
 HAZE on Instagram
 
 

1988 births
Living people
American hip hop record producers
Record producers from California
Songwriters from California